Arnold Krupat, Ph.D. (born 1941) is an American author and Professor of Literature at Sarah Lawrence College in Bronxville, New York. His work has been published in Nineteenth-Century Fiction, The Quest, and Sarah Lawrence Journal. He is a recipient of six fellowships from the National Endowment for the Humanities, and has also held a Fulbright Fellowship, an Woodrow Wilson Fellowship, and a Guggenheim Fellowship.

Personal background 
Krupat was born in 1941 in the Bronx, New York and grew up in the Jacob Riis Housing Projects on the lower east side of Manhattan. He went to public grade school and then to Stuyvesant High School, from which he graduated in 1958.

He attended New York University's Washington Square College of Arts and Science on scholarship, earning his bachelor's degree summa cum laude and Phi Beta Kappa in 1962. From 1962 to 1963, he spent a year at the Universite de Strasbourg on a Fulbright Fellowship. After returning to New York, he entered graduate school at Columbia University on a Woodrow Wilson Foundation Fellowship. He received his Ph.D from Columbia with honors in 1967.

Family
In 1962, Krupat married Kitty Weiss; the couple divorced in 1966.

In 1968, he married Cynthia Muser. While the couple divorced in 1993, together, they had two children. Their daughter, Tanya, is a social  worker with the Osborne Association in New York, and lives in Brooklyn with her son, Arlo Krupat. Their son, Jeremy, is a professor at the Business School at Cambridge University (UK).

In 2007, Krupat married Andrea Ferster, a  lawyer in Washington, D.C. They were divorced in 2012. He lives in Hastings-on-Hudson, New York.

Professional background 
Academic work
From 1965 to 1968, Krupat taught in the English Department at Rutgers University in New Brunswick, New Jersey. He started teaching at Sarah Lawrence College in Bronxville, New York in 1968. He retired in June 2012.

Writing
While teaching at Sarah Lawrence, Krupat developed an interest in critical theory and Native American literature. His first book, For Those Who Come After: a Study of Native American Autobiography, was published in 1985. A second edition, with a foreword by Paul John Eakin, appeared in 1987.

In 1989, he published a novel, Woodsmen, or Thoreau & the Indians, and in 2012 What-to-do? a novel. He has also authored, edited, or co-edited 12 more books. His most recent publications are Changed Forever: American Indian Boarding-School Literature, volume 1 published in 2018, and volume 2, 2020. Boarding School Voices: Carlisle Indian Students Speak is forthcoming in 2021.

He is also the author of Ethnocriticism: Ethnography, History, Literature; The Voice in the Margin: Native American Literature and the Canon; and Red Matters. In 2007, he wrote All That Remains: Native Studies. He was the editor of a number of anthologies, including Native American Autobiography: An Anthology and New Voices in Native American Literary Criticism.

In 2001, he edited Here First: Autobiographical Essays by Native American Writers, with Brian Swann. The work was honored with the Wordcraft Circle of Native Writers and Storytellers Award for best book of nonfiction prose.

Krupat has contributed chapters to edited books, and his essays have appeared in the major professional journals. He has been the editor for Native American literature for the Norton Anthology of American Literature from its 5th to its  8th edition. He has presented talks at colleges and universities throughout the United States as well as in Brazil, Cyprus, England, France, Germany, Hungary, Italy, Norway, Sweden, and Wales.

Fellowships 
Krupat is a recipient of six fellowships from the National Endowment for the Humanities. In 2007, he was the recipient of the Sarah Lawrence Excellence in Teaching Award.
 1962: Fulbright Fellowship
 1963: Woodrow Wilson Foundation Fellowship
 2005: Guggenheim Fellowship

Published works 
 Krupat, Arnold. For Those Who Come After: A Study of Native American Autobiography, University of California Press, 1989. 
 Krupat, Arnold. The Voice in the Margin: Native American Literature and the Canon, University of California Press, 1989. 
 Krupat, Arnold. Ethnocriticism: Ethnography, History, Literature, University of California Press, 1992. 
 Krupat, Arnold. Woodsmen, or Thoreau and the Indians, University of Oklahoma Press, 1994. 
 Krupat, Arnold. The Turn to the Native: Studies in Criticism and Culture, Bison Books, 1998. 
 Krupat, Arnold. Red Matters: Native American Studies (Rethinking the Americas), University of Pennsylvania Press, 2002. 
 Baym, Nina; Franklin, Wayne; Gura, Philip F.; Krupat, Arnold; and Levine, Robert S. (editors). Norton Anthology of American Literature, New York: W.W. Norton and Co., 2007. 
 Krupat, Arnold. All That Remains: Varieties of Indigenous Expression , University of Nebraska Press, 2009. 
 Krupat, Arnold. That the People Might Live: Loss and Renewal in Native American Elegy, Cornell University Press, 2012.
Krupat, Arnold, ed. "Companion to James Welch's The Heartsong of Charging Elk." University of Nebraska Press, 2015.

References

External links 
 Arnold Krupat at Sarah Lawrence College

1941 births
Living people
People from the Bronx
Sarah Lawrence College faculty
American literary theorists
American male writers
Stuyvesant High School alumni
Columbia University alumni
New York University alumni